SuperWrite is an English shorthand system based largely on previous shorthand systems and largely intended for people who need to increase their writing speed without devoting months to learning more complicated systems.  It is a writing system, as it uses cursive forms of the letters of the spoken alphabet to represent sounds.  Aside from assigning special abbreviations to common words, the system functions largely by omitting short vowels from within words.  Hence, SuperWrite could be considered an impure abjad.  Its publishers claim it uses only the 26 letters of the longhand alphabet with no extra symbols, however, the capital letters used (C, O, S, T, U, X) have different functions from their lowercase forms, and the uncrossed t — which would be considered a mistake in longhand — has a different function from the crossed t, bringing the total number of symbols in SuperWrite to 33.
SuperWrite was developed by A. James Lemaster, with assistance from Ellen Hankin and John Metz Baer.

See Lemaster, A. J., & Baer, J. (1999). SuperWrite (Vol. 1).  Cincinnati:  South-Western , and

Lemaster, A. J., & Baer, J. (1999). SuperWrite (Vol. 2).  Cincinnati:  South-Western

External links
Tripod.com
SuperWrite:Alphabetic Writing System, Office Professional, Volume Two
Wise Geek

exec

Writing systems
Transcription (linguistics)